Trenčín Electric Railway (TREŽ) is the name of the Slovakian  narrow-gauge rail transport line between Trenčianska Teplá and the town of Trenčianske Teplice in with tram vehicles operating on the track. It is approximately 5.5 km long and consists of one inter-station section, while the only crossover called Kaňová was abolished in the second half of the 1990s.

Operation

History 
The line was put into operation on 27 June 1909 after less than a year of construction. It became a junction of the main railway line from Bratislava to Košice (5th TEN-T Corridor) and the spa town of Trenčianske Teplice. 

The system was built as a narrow gauge  railway and is electrified. The supply voltage started at 750 V, and in 1942 it was increased to 950 V. In 1984, it was reduced to 600 V. In 2000, the whole line was modernized, but currently, the operation on this line is provided by the non-profit organization TREŽ, n.o. 

The peculiarity of this track is that to this day, for example, the wooden masts on the traction line have been preserved. The track is oldest traction line in Central and Eastern Europe.

Future 
Since the beginning of the 21st century, the whole system is constantly undermined by a possibly of decommissioning the line, which has so far been delayed. On 8 March 2013, the municipality of Trenčianska Teplá founded the non-profit organization Trenčianska Electric Railway, n.o. (TREŽ), which started to operate the same year. 

Only one nostalgic service a month operated up until 2015. By obtaining a license in the summer of 2015 and with the financial support of the Trenčín Self-Governing Region, TREŽ, n.o. in addition to nostalgic year-round rides, also launched regular summer weekend operation of the railway, with a connection to the train and bus connections.

Rolling stock 
At present, the vehicle fleet consists of three electric motor wagons of the 411.9 series (former EMU 46.1). All wagons were produced in 1951 and 1952, but in the 1980s they underwent reconstruction, in which significant modifications were made.

Bibliography 
 
 
 

This article incorporates information from the corresponding article in Slovak Wikipedia

External links 

600 V DC railway electrification
Start-Class rail transport articles